Mount Zion  is a historic home located at Milldale, Warren County, Virginia. It was built in 1771–1772, and is a two-story, seven bay, fieldstone mansion.  It has a hipped roof and four interior end chimneys.  The front facade features windows in a widely spaced Palladian motif on the second story.

It was listed on the National Register of Historic Places in 1970, and was listed again as part of the Rockland Rural Historic District in 2015.

See also
National Register of Historic Places listings in Warren County, Virginia

References

External links
 
Mount Zion, State Route 624, Front Royal, Warren County, VA: 2 photos and 3 data pages at Historic American Buildings Survey

Historic American Buildings Survey in Virginia
Houses completed in 1772
Houses in Warren County, Virginia
Houses on the National Register of Historic Places in Virginia
Individually listed contributing properties to historic districts on the National Register in Virginia
National Register of Historic Places in Warren County, Virginia
1772 establishments in Virginia